Platinum plan may refer to:

 An offering of the United States' Patient Protection and Affordable Care Act defined as covering 90 percent of out-of-pocket costs
 A travel insurance plan offered by American International Group
 Platinum Plan for Black America, a proposal by Donald Trump unveiled in September 2020